The Harrisburg Senators are a minor league baseball team in the Double-A Northeast league that has played since 1987.

Harrisburg Senators may also refer to:

Harrisburg Senators (basketball), a former American Basketball League team
Harrisburg Senators (1893-1952), a series of defunct minor league baseball teams
Members of the Pennsylvania State Senate, which convenes in Harrisburg